The MacRobertson Trophy Air Race (also known as the London to Melbourne Air Race) took place in October 1934 as part of the Melbourne Centenary celebrations. The race was devised by the Lord Mayor of Melbourne, Sir Harold Gengoult Smith, and the prize money of £15,000 was provided by Sir Macpherson Robertson, a wealthy Australian confectionery manufacturer, on the conditions that the race be named after his MacRobertson confectionery company, and that it was organised to be as safe as possible. A further condition was that a gold medal be awarded to each pilot who completed the course within 16 days.

The race was organised by an Air Race Committee, with representatives from the Australian government, aviation, and Melbourne Centenary authorities. The Royal Aero Club oversaw the event. There were five compulsory stops, at Baghdad, Allahabad, Singapore, Darwin, and Charleville, Queensland; otherwise the competitors could choose their own routes. A further 22 optional stops were provided with stocks of fuel and oil provided by Shell and Stanavo. The Royal Aero Club put some effort into persuading the countries along the route to improve the facilities at the stopping points.

The basic rules were: no limit to the size of aircraft or power, no limit to crew size, and no pilot to join aircraft after it left England. Aircraft had to carry three days' rations per crew member, floats, smoke signals, and efficient instruments. There were prizes for the outright fastest aircraft, and for the best performance on a handicap formula by any aircraft finishing within 16 days.

The start was set at dawn (6:30) on 20 October 1934. By then, the initial field of over 60 had been whittled down to 20, including three purpose-built de Havilland DH.88 Comet racers, two of the new generation of American all-metal airliners, and a mixture of earlier racers, light transports, and old bombers.

First off the line, watched by a crowd of 60,000, were Jim and Amy Mollison in the Comet Black Magic, and they were early leaders in the race until forced to retire at Allahabad with engine trouble. This left the DH.88 Grosvenor House, flown by Flight Lt. C. W. A. Scott and Captain Tom Campbell Black, well ahead of the field, and they went on to win in a time of less than 3 days, despite flying the last stage with one engine throttled back because of an oil-pressure indicator giving a faulty low reading. They would have won the handicap prize as well, but the race rules stipulated that no aircraft could win more than one prize.

Significantly, both second and third places were taken by airliners, the KLM Douglas DC-2 PH-AJU Uiver ("Stork") and Roscoe Turner's Boeing 247-D. Both completed the course in less than a day more than the winner; KLM's DC-2 was even flying a regular route with passengers.
 

During the race, the Uiver, low on fuel after the crew had become lost when caught in a thunderstorm, ended up over Albury, New South Wales. Lyle Ferris, the chief electrical engineer of the post office, went to the power station and signalled "A-L-B-U-R-Y" to the aircraft in Morse code by turning the town street lights on and off. Arthur Newnham, the announcer on radio station 2CO Corowa appealed for cars to line up on the racecourse to light up a makeshift runway. 

The Uiver landed successfully, and next morning was pulled out of the mud by locals to fly on to Melbourne and win the handicap section of the race, coming second overall. In gratitude KLM made a large donation to Albury Hospital and Alf Waugh, the Mayor of Albury, was awarded a title in Dutch nobility.

Later that year the DC-2, on a flight from The Netherlands to Batavia, crashed (near Ar Rutba, Iraq), killing all seven on board; it is commemorated by a flying replica.

The race was the basis for a 1991 Australian television miniseries The Great Air Race.

See also
England to Australia flight

Notes

References
Lewis, Peter. 1970. British Racing and Record-Breaking Aircraft. Putnam

External links

 MacRobertson Air Race - State Library of NSW
 MacRobertson Air Race - Uiver Memorial Community Trust, Albury NSW
 Comet DH88 - fastest from England to Australia
 The Great Air Race, a TV Movie about MacRobertson Air Race
 The Uiver Collection, Albury NSW
 Tom Campbell Black co-winner of the MacRobertson London to Melbourne Air Race 1934

Air races
Aviation in Australia
Aviation history of the United Kingdom
1934 in Australian sport
1934 in aviation
Articles containing video clips
1934 in Australia
1934 in London
1930s in Melbourne